The 1976 Eastern Suburbs season was the 69th in the club's history. They competed in the NSWRFL's 1976 Premiership, finishing the regular season 5th (out of 12) to reach the play-offs. They were then knocked out in their first finals match by Canterbury-Bnakstown. Easts also competed in the 1976 Amco Cup.

This season Eastern Suburbs became the first rugby league team, and one of the first in Australian sport, to sport a sponsor's name on their jersey.

Ladder

World Club Challenge

Rugby league's inaugural World Club Challenge was contested between Australia's, Eastern Suburbs Roosters and England's St Helens R.F.C., it was played at the Sydney Cricket Ground on 29 June 1976.

Eastern Suburbs 25( Fairfax, Stevens, Ayliffe, Schubert, Townshend Tries; Brass 5 Goals) defeated St Helens RFC 2(G.Pimblett Goal) played at the Sydney Cricket Ground.

The lineups were: Eastern Suburbs
• Coach:Jack Gibson
• Russell Fairfax 
• Ian Schubert
• Mark Harris
• John Brass
• Bill Mullins 
• Trevor Barnes
• Kevin Stevens 
• Barry Reilly
• Arthur Beetson(c)
• Ian Mackay
• Royce Ayliffe
• Elwyn Walters
• Kel Jones :
• Robert Laurie
• John Mayes
• Grant Hedger
• G.Townsend.

St Helens FC • Geoff Pimblett • L.Jones • E.Cunningham • D.Noonan • R.Mathias • W.Benyon • K. Gwilliam • D.Hull • George Nicholls • E. Chisnall • K.Coslett(c) • A.Karalius • J.Mantle:• P.Glynn, F.Wilson • J. Heaton • M. James.

References

External links
 The Story of Australian Rugby League, Gary Lester

Sydney Roosters seasons
Eastern Suburbs season